Cracker is a British crime drama series, created and principally written by Jimmy McGovern, and starring Robbie Coltrane and Geraldine Somerville. A total of three series and two specials were broadcast over the course of thirteen years. Episodes varied in length from 50 minutes (series one-three) to 120 minutes (specials). The original broadcast of episode one of the "Brotherly Love" story was an hour long, a total of 70 minutes with commercials, and shown on the Sunday before the regular Monday slot for the series. Further broadcasts of this episode, including VHS and DVD release, were edited down to the conventional 50 minute size.

Series overview

Episodes

Series 1 (1993)

Series 2 (1994)

Series 3 (1995)

Special (1996)

Special (2006)

References

External links

Cracker at itv.com
Cracker at the British Film Institute

The Unofficial Guide To Cracker

1993 British television seasons
1994 British television seasons
1995 British television seasons
Lists of British crime television series episodes
Lists of British drama television series episodes
Lists of mystery television series episodes